Srnec (Czech feminine: Srncová) is a surname. Notable people with the surname include:

 Aleksandar Srnec (1924–2010), Croatian artist
 Božena Srncová (1925–1997), Czech gymnast
 Jiří Srnec (1931–2021), Czech theatre director and artist

See also
 

Czech-language surnames